Dalbergia is a large genus of small to medium-size trees, shrubs and lianas in the pea family, Fabaceae, subfamily Faboideae. It was recently assigned to the informal monophyletic Dalbergia clade (or tribe): the Dalbergieae.  The genus has a wide distribution, native to the tropical regions of Central and South America, Africa, Madagascar and southern Asia.

Fossil record
A fossil †Dalbergia phleboptera seed pod has been found in a Chattian deposit, in the municipality of Aix-en-Provence in France. Fossils of †Dalbergia nostratum have been found in rhyodacite tuff of Lower Miocene age in Southern Slovakia near the town of Lučenec. Fossil seed pods of †Dalbergia mecsekense have been found in a Sarmatian deposit in Hungary. †Dalbergia lucida fossils have been described from the Xiaolongtan Formation of late Miocene age in Kaiyuan County, Yunnan Province, China.

Uses
Many species of Dalbergia are important timber trees, valued for their decorative and often fragrant wood, rich in aromatic oils. The most famous of these are the rosewoods, so-named because of the smell of the timber when cut, but several other valuable woods are yielded by the genus.

Species such as Dalbergia nigra known as Rio, Bahia, Brazilian rosewood, palisander de Rio Grande, or jacaranda and Dalbergia latifolia known as (East) Indian Rosewood or Sonokeling have been heavily used in furniture given their colour and grain. Several East Asian species are important materials in traditional Chinese furniture.

The (Brazilian) tulipwood (D. decipularis) is cream coloured with red or salmon stripes. It is most often used in crossbanding and other veneers; it should not be confused with the "tulipwood" of the American tulip tree Liriodendron tulipifera, used in inexpensive cabinetwork.

The similarly used (but purple with darker stripes), and also Brazilian, kingwood is yielded by D. cearensis. Both are smallish to medium-sized trees, to 10 m. Another notable timber is cocobolo, mainly from D. retusa, a Central American timber with spectacular decorative orange red figure on freshly cut surfaces which quickly fades in air to more subdued tones and hues.

Dalbergia sissoo (Indian rosewood) is primarily used for furniture in northern India. Its export is highly regulated due to recent high rates of tree death due to unknown causes. Dalbergia sissoo has historically been the primary rosewood species of northern India. This wood is strong and tough, with color golden to dark brown. It is extremely durable and handsome, and it maintains its shape well. It can be easily seasoned. It is difficult to work, but it takes a fine polish. It is used for high quality furniture, plywoods, bridge piles, sporting goods, and railway sleepers. It is a very good material for decorative work and carvings. Its density is 770 kg/m3.

African blackwood (D. melanoxylon) is an intensely black wood in demand for making woodwind musical instruments.

Dalbergia species are used as food plants by the larvae of some Lepidoptera species including Bucculatrix mendax which feeds exclusively on Dalbergia sissoo.

The Dalbergia species are notorious for causing allergic reactions due to the presence of sensitizing quinones in the wood.

Conservation
All Dalbergia species are protected under the Convention on International Trade in Endangered Species of Wild Fauna and Flora (CITES). All but Dalbergia nigra are listed in Appendix II, with D.nigra listed in Appendix I.

Species
Dalbergia comprises the following species:

 Dalbergia abbreviata Craib
 Dalbergia abrahamii Bosser & R. Rabev.

 Dalbergia acariiantha Harms
 Dalbergia acuta Benth.
 Dalbergia acutifoliolata Mendonca & Sousa
 Dalbergia adami Berhaut
 Dalbergia afzeliana G. Don
 Dalbergia ajudana Harms
 Dalbergia albertisii Prain
 Dalbergia albiflora Hutch. & Dalziel
 subsp. albiflora Hutch. & Dalziel
 subsp. echinocarpa Hepper
 Dalbergia altissima Baker f.
 Dalbergia altissima Pittier
 Dalbergia amazonica (Radlk.) Ducke

 Dalbergia andapensis Bosser & R. Rabev.

 Dalbergia antsirananae Phillipson, Crameri & N.Wilding
 Dalbergia arbutifolia Baker
 Dalbergia armata E. Mey. — Hluhluwe creeper
 Dalbergia assamica Benth.

 Dalbergia aurea Bosser & R. Rabev.
 Dalbergia bakeri Baker
 Dalbergia balansae Prain

 Dalbergia baronii Baker — Madagascar rosewood, Palisander rosewood, Palissandre voamboana

 Dalbergia bathiei R. Vig.
 Dalbergia beccarii Prain
 Dalbergia beddomei Thoth.

 Dalbergia benthamii Prain

 Dalbergia bignonae Berhaut
 Dalbergia bintuluensis Sunarno & Ohashi

 Dalbergia boehmii Taub.

 Dalbergia bojeri Drake
 Dalbergia boniana Gagnep.
 Dalbergia borneensis Prain
 Dalbergia brachystachya Bosser & R. Rabev.
 Dalbergia bracteolata Baker
 Dalbergia brasiliensis Vogel
 Dalbergia brownei (Jacq.) Urb. — Coin vine
 Dalbergia burmanica Prain
 Dalbergia calderonii Standl.
 subsp. calderonii Standl.
 subsp. molinae Rudd
 Dalbergia calycina Benth.

 Dalbergia campenonii Drake
 Dalbergia cana Kurz
 Dalbergia candenatensis (Dennst.) Prain
 Dalbergia canescens (Elmer) Merr.
 Dalbergia capuronii Bosser & R. Rabev.
 Dalbergia carringtoniana Sousa

 Dalbergia catingicola Harms
 Dalbergia caudata G. Don

 Dalbergia cearensis Ducke — Kingwood

 Dalbergia chapelieri Baill.

 Dalbergia chlorocarpa R. Vig.
 Dalbergia chontalensis Standl. & L.O. Williams

 Dalbergia clarkei Thoth.

 Dalbergia cochinchinensis Pierre ex Laness. — Siamese rosewood, Thailand rosewood, Tracwood (synonym Dalbergia cambodiana Pierre)
 Dalbergia commiphoroides Baker f.
 Dalbergia confertiflora Benth.
 Dalbergia congensis Baker f.
 Dalbergia congesta Wight & Arn.
 Dalbergia congestiflora Pittier
 Dalbergia coromandeliana Prain
 Dalbergia crispa Hepper
 Dalbergia cubilquitzensis (Donn. Sm.) Pittier
 Dalbergia cucullata Pittier
 Dalbergia cuiabensis Benth.

 Dalbergia cultrata Benth.
 Dalbergia cumingiana Benth.

 Dalbergia curtisii Prain
 Dalbergia cuscatlanica (Standl.) Standl.
 Dalbergia dalzielii Hutch. & Dalziel
 Dalbergia darienensis Rudd

 Dalbergia davidii Bosser & R. Rabev.
 Dalbergia debilis J.F. Macbr.
 Dalbergia decipularis Rizzini & A. Mattos — Tulipwood

 Dalbergia delphinensis Bosser & R. Rabev.
 Dalbergia densa Benth.

 Dalbergia densiflora (Benth.) Benth.

 Dalbergia discolor Blume

 Dalbergia duarensis Thoth.

 Dalbergia dyeriana Harms
 Dalbergia ealaensis De Wild.

 Dalbergia ecastaphyllum (L.) Taub. — Coin vine

 Dalbergia elegans A.M. Carvalho

 Dalbergia emirnensis Benth.

 Dalbergia enneaphylla Pittier
 Dalbergia entadoides Prain
 Dalbergia eremicola Polhill
 Dalbergia ernest-ulei Hoehne
 Dalbergia errans Craib
 Dalbergia erubescens Bosser & R. Rabev.

 Dalbergia falcata Prain

 Dalbergia fischeri Taub.

 Dalbergia floribunda Craib
 Dalbergia florifera De Wild.

 Dalbergia foliolosa Benth.
 Dalbergia foliosa (Benth.) A.M. Carvalho
 Dalbergia forbesii Prain
 Dalbergia fouilloyana Pellegr.

 Dalbergia frutescens (Vell.) Britton — Brazilian tulipwood, Jacarandá rosa, Pau de fuso, Pau rosa, Pinkwood, Tulipwood
 Dalbergia funera Standl.
 Dalbergia fusca Pierre
 Dalbergia gardneriana Benth.
 Dalbergia gentilii De Wild.

 Dalbergia gilbertii Cronquist

 Dalbergia glaberrima Bosser & R. Rabev.
 Dalbergia glabra (Mill.) Standl.
 Dalbergia glandulosa Benth.

 Dalbergia glaucescens (Benth.) Benth.
 Dalbergia glaucocarpa Bosser & R. Rabev.
 Dalbergia glaziovii Harms
 Dalbergia glomerata Hemsl.

 Dalbergia godefroyi Prain

 Dalbergia gossweileri Baker f.
 Dalbergia gracilis Benth.
 Dalbergia granadillo Pittier
 Dalbergia grandibracteata De Wild.

 Dalbergia grandistipula A.M. Carvalho
 Dalbergia greveana Baill.

 Dalbergia guttembergii A.M. Carvalho
 Dalbergia hainanensis Merr. & Chun
 Dalbergia hancei Benth.

 Dalbergia havilandii Prain

 Dalbergia henryana Prain

 Dalbergia heudelotii Stapf
 Dalbergia hiemalis Malme
 Dalbergia hildebrandtii Vatke

 Dalbergia hirticalyx Bosser & R. Rabev.

 Dalbergia horrida (Dennst.) Mabb.
 Dalbergia hortensis Heringer & al.
 Dalbergia hoseana Prain
 Dalbergia hostilis Benth.
 Dalbergia hullettii Prain
 Dalbergia humbertii R. Vig.
 Dalbergia hupeana Hance
 Dalbergia hygrophila (Benth.) Hoehne

 Dalbergia intermedia A.M. Carvalho
 Dalbergia intibucana Standl. & L.O. Williams
 Dalbergia inundata Benth.
 Dalbergia iquitosensis Harms

 Dalbergia jaherii Burck

 Dalbergia junghuhnii Benth.
 Dalbergia kerrii Craib
 Dalbergia kingiana Prain
 Dalbergia kisantuensis De Wild. & T. Durand
 Dalbergia kostermansii Sunarno & Ohashi

 Dalbergia kunstleri Prain
 Dalbergia kurzii Prain

 Dalbergia lacei Thoth.
 Dalbergia lactea Vatke

 Dalbergia lakhonensis Gagnep.
 Dalbergia lanceolaria L. f.
 Dalbergia lastoursvillensis Pellegr.
 Dalbergia lateriflora Benth.
 Dalbergia latifolia Roxb. — Bombay blackwood, East Indian rosewood, Indian palisandre, Indian rosewood, Irugudujava, Java palisandre, Malabar, Sonokeling, Shisham, Sitsal, Satisal

 Dalbergia laxiflora Micheli
 Dalbergia lemurica Bosser & R. Rabev.
 Dalbergia librevillensis Pellegr.

 Dalbergia louisii Cronquist
 Dalbergia louvelii R. Vig. — violet rosewood

 Dalbergia macrosperma Baker

 Dalbergia madagascariensis Vatke
 Dalbergia malabarica Prain
 Dalbergia malangensis Sousa
 Dalbergia marcaniana Craib

 Dalbergia maritima R. Vig.
 Dalbergia martinii F. White

 Dalbergia mayumbensis Baker f.

 Dalbergia melanocardium Pittier
 Dalbergia melanoxylon Guill. & Perr. — African blackwood, African ebony, African grenadilo, Banbanus, Ebene, Granadilla, Granadille d'Afrique, Mpingo, Pau preto, Poyi, Zebrawood
 Dalbergia menoeides Prain
 Dalbergia mexicana Pittier

 Dalbergia microphylla Chiov.
 Dalbergia millettii Benth.
 Dalbergia mimosella (Blanco) Prain
 Dalbergia mimosoides Franch.

 Dalbergia miscolobium Benth.
 Dalbergia mollis Bosser & R. Rabev.
 Dalbergia monetaria L. f. — Moneybush
 Dalbergia monophylla G.A. Black

 Dalbergia monticola Bosser & R. Rabev.

 Dalbergia multijuga E. Mey.

 Dalbergia negrensis (Radlk.) Ducke

 Dalbergia neoperrieri Bosser & R. Rabev.

 Dalbergia ngounyensis Pellegr.
 Dalbergia nigra (Vell.) Benth. — Bahia rosewood, Brazilian rosewood, Cabiuna, Caviuna, Jacarandá, Jacarandá de Brasil, Palisander, Palisandre da Brésil, Pianowood, Rio rosewood, Rosewood, Obuina
 Dalbergia nigrescens Kurz
 Dalbergia nitida (Benth.) Hoehne
 Dalbergia nitidula Baker
 Dalbergia noldeae Harms
 Dalbergia normandii Bosser & R. Rabev.

 Dalbergia obcordata N.Wilding, Phillipson & Crameri
 Dalbergia obovata E. Mey. — Climbing flat bean

 Dalbergia obtusifolia (Baker) Prain

 Dalbergia odorifera T.C. Chen — Fragrant rosewood
 Dalbergia oligophylla Hutch. & Dalziel
 Dalbergia oliveri Prain (synonyms: Dalbergia bariensis Pierre, Dalbergia dongnaiensis Pierre, D. duperreana Pierre & Dalbergia mammosa Pierre)

 Dalbergia orientalis Bosser & R. Rabev.
 Dalbergia ovata Benth.

 Dalbergia pachycarpa (De Wild. & T. Durand) De Wild.

 Dalbergia palo-escrito Rzed. — Palo escrito

 Dalbergia parviflora Roxb.
 Dalbergia paucifoliolata Lundell
 Dalbergia peguensis Thoth.
 Dalbergia peishaensis Chun & T. Chen
 Dalbergia peltieri Bosser & R. Rabev.

 Dalbergia pervillei Vatke

 Dalbergia pierreana Prain

 Dalbergia pinnata (Lour.) Prain
 Dalbergia pluriflora Baker f.
 Dalbergia polyadelpha Prain
 Dalbergia polyphylla Benth.

 Dalbergia prainii Thoth.

 Dalbergia pseudo-ovata Thoth.
 Dalbergia pseudo-sissoo Miq.
 Dalbergia pseudobaronii R. Vig.

 Dalbergia purpurascens Baill.

 Dalbergia reniformis Roxb.
 Dalbergia reticulata Merr.
 Dalbergia retusa Hemsl. — Caviuna, Cocobolo, Cocobolo prieto, Funeram, Granadillo, Jacarandáholz, Nambar, Nicaraguan rosewood, Palisander, Palissandro, Palo negro, Pau preto, Rosewood, Urauna

 Dalbergia revoluta Ducke

 Dalbergia richardsii Sunarno & Ohashi
 Dalbergia riedelii (Benth.) Sandwith
 Dalbergia rimosa Roxb.
 Dalbergia riparia (Mart.) Benth.

 Dalbergia rostrata Hassk.
 Dalbergia rubiginosa Roxb.
 Dalbergia rufa G. Don
 Dalbergia rugosa Hepper
 Dalbergia sacerdotum Prain
 Dalbergia sambesiaca Schinz
 Dalbergia sampaioana Kuhlm. & Hoehne
 Dalbergia sandakanensis Sunarno & Ohashi
 Dalbergia saxatilis Hook. f.

 Dalbergia scortechinii (Prain) Prain
 Dalbergia sericea G. Don

 Dalbergia setifera Hutch. & Dalziel

 Dalbergia simpsonii Rudd
 Dalbergia sissoides Wight & Arn.
 Dalbergia sissoo DC. — Agara, Agaru, Errasissu, Gette, Hihu, Indian rosewood, Irugudujava, Iruvil, Iti, Khujrap, Padimi, Safedar, Sheesham, Shinshapa, Shisham, Shishma, Shishom, Sinsupa, Sissoo, Sisu, Tali, Tenach, Tukreekung, Yette
 Dalbergia spinosa Roxb.
 Dalbergia spruceana (Benth.) Benth. — Amazon rosewood

 Dalbergia stenophylla Prain
 Dalbergia stercoracea Prain
 Dalbergia stevensonii Standl. — Honduras rosewood, Nagaed
 Dalbergia stipulacea Roxb.

 Dalbergia suaresensis Baill.

 Dalbergia subcymosa Ducke
 Dalbergia succirubra Gagnep. & Craib

 Dalbergia teijsmannii Sunarno & Ohashi
 Dalbergia teixeirae Sousa

 Dalbergia thomsonii Benth.
 Dalbergia thorelii Gagnep.
 Dalbergia tilarana N. Zamora

 Dalbergia tinnevelliensis Thoth.

 Dalbergia tonkinensis Prain

 Dalbergia travancorica Thoth.
 Dalbergia trichocarpa Baker
 Dalbergia tricolor Drake
 Dalbergia tsaratananensis Bosser & R. Rabev.
 Dalbergia tsiandalana R. Vig.
 Dalbergia tsoi Merr. & Chun
 Dalbergia tucurensis Donn. Sm. — Guatemalan rosewood
 Dalbergia uarandensis (Chiov.) Thulin
 Dalbergia urschii Bosser & R. Rabev.
 Dalbergia vacciniifolia Vatke

 Dalbergia velutina Benth.
 Dalbergia verrucosa Craib
 Dalbergia viguieri Bosser & R. Rabev.
 Dalbergia villosa (Benth.) Benth.

 Dalbergia volubilis Roxb.

 Dalbergia wattii C.B. Clarke
 Dalbergia xerophila Bosser & R. Rabev.
 Dalbergia yunnanensis Franch.

References

External links

 
Fabaceae genera